WGSY (100.1 FM) is a radio station licensed to serve Phenix City, Alabama, United States. The station is owned by iHeartMedia, Inc. and licensed to iHM Licenses, LLC. Its studios are in Columbus east of downtown, and its transmitter is in Phenix City.

It broadcasts an adult contemporary music format to the Columbus, Georgia, area. The station departs from its usual format and broadcasts Christmas music during the holiday season.

The station was assigned the WGSY call letters by the Federal Communications Commission on January 1, 1987. M&M Partners Inc. purchased this station in July 1996 for approximately $2 million.

On January 18, 2018 (after stunting with Christmas music for three days as "Santa 100"), WGSY launched an urban contemporary format, branded as "Hot 100". The station changed its call sign to WHTY on January 25, 2018.

On June 29, 2020, WHTY changed formats from urban contemporary to adult contemporary, branded as "Sunny 100.1". On August 3, 2020, WHTY's call sign changed to WGSY.

Former logos

References

External links

GSY
Mainstream adult contemporary radio stations in the United States
Russell County, Alabama
Radio stations established in 1971
IHeartMedia radio stations
1971 establishments in Alabama